Thomas McInerney (born 1937) is a retired US Air Force general.

Thomas McInerney may also refer to:

 Thomas McInerney (politician) (1854–1934), Australian politician
 Tom McInerney (1905–1998), Irish sportsman
 Thomas J. McInerney (executive), American CEO of Altaba Inc
 Thomas J. McInerney (politician) (1924–1998), American politician in the New York State Assembly